Jupp is a surname, originating in the English county of Sussex and may refer to:

In music
 Eric Jupp (1922–2003), British musician
 Mickey Jupp (born 1944), English musician
 Richard Jupp (musician) (21st century), British drummer

In sport
 Duncan Jupp (born 1975), Scottish footballer
 Gabrielle Jupp (born 1997), British gymnast
 George Jupp (cricketer, born 1845) (1845–1930), English cricketer
 George Jupp (cricketer, born 1875) (1875–1938), English cricketer
 Harry Jupp (1841–1889), English cricketer
 Vallance Jupp (1891–1960), English cricketer

Other
 Alex Jupp (born 1927), Canadian politician
 James Jupp (born 1932), British-Australian political scientist
 Miles Jupp (born 1979), British actor
 Richard Jupp (1728–1799), English architect
 Roger Jupp (born 1956), English bishop
Simon Jupp (born 1985), British politician

Surnames
English-language surnames
Surnames of English origin
Surnames of British Isles origin